Come to Where I'm From is the second studio album by Joseph Arthur, released by Real World Records on April 11, 2000. The album was co-produced by T-Bone Burnett, and features the singles "Chemical" and "In the Sun". Arthur said, "I wanted to get the songs down in a way that was true to them and true to myself. I really wanted them to have humanity in them. I wanted an element of a gamble in it. I think too much music sounds too contained. I wanted it to sound like it could go out of control at any minute. I didn't want it produced to death."

Real World Records reissued the album in July 2012, as a part of their Real World Gold series.

Track listing

Rusty Water
On March 11, 1999, a promo CD titled Rusty Water was released via Virgin Records. The CD featured 13 tracks, most of which would later be re-recorded, edited, and remixed to become Come to Where I'm From. As this was not the official finalized release, few promos were made.

 "Crawlin' on Bones" (a.k.a. "Cockroach") – 3:04
 "In the Sun" (Early Version) – 5:24
 "Exhausted" (Early Version) – 4:03
 "History" – 5:37
 "Chemical" – 4:06
 "Cocaine Blind" – 3:17
 "Freeze You Out" – 4:30
 "Tattoo" – 4:07
 "Eyes on My Back" – 4:12
 "In the Distance" – 3:24
 "California" – 4:14
 "Otherside" – 3:16
 "Invisible Hands" – 5:26

Note
The songs "Cocaine Blind" and "Otherside" (later renamed "The Other Side") appeared as B-sides to the "In the Sun" single. "California", "Freeze You Out", and "In the Distance" have not been released or re-recorded since this promo was issued.

Personnel

Musicians
 Joseph Arthur (as "Benzo") – guitar and vocals on all tracks.
 Carla Azar (as "Darkstar") – drums on tracks 2, 3, 6, 8, 9, 10, 11 and 12; background vocals on track 6; shaker on track 8.
 T-Bone Burnett (as "Yodaclaus") – piano on track 6.
 Markus Dravs (as "Luvclaw") – programming on tracks 4 and 7.
 Eugene Kelly (as "Eugene") – "Fuzzheart" on track 11.
 Ben Findlay (as "Spiralchugger") – additional acoustic guitar on track 4.
 Nadia Lanman (as "Queenchina") – cello on track 1.
 Jim Keltner (as "Nighttime") – drums on track 5.
 Stella Katsoudas (as "Siren") – background vocals on track 1.
 Rick Will (as "Lovehammer") – "explosions" on track 5; synthesizer on tracks 7 and 9; "kooky shit" on track 11.

Production and design
 Produced by T-Bone Burnett, Joseph Arthur and Rick Will.
 Mixed by Rick Will, except:
 Tracks 1, 5 and 12 mixed by Tchad Blake.
 Engineered by Rick Will.
 Additional engineering by Ben Findlay.
 Assistant engineering by Nick Raskulinecz and Kevin Dean Marek.
 Recorded at Sound City, Sunset Sound and Real World Studios.
 Mastered by Stephen Marcussen at A&M Mastering.
 Album cover drawings and paintings by Joseph Arthur.
 Booklet photography by Anton Corbijn.
 Art direction and design by Zachary James Larner with Joseph Arthur at Bombshelter NYC.

References

External links
 Come to Where I'm From EPK

Joseph Arthur albums
2000 albums
Real World Records albums
Albums produced by T Bone Burnett
Albums produced by Tchad Blake
Virgin Records albums